Violent Light is the third studio album by Milagres. It was released through Kill Rock Stars (US) and Memphis Industries (Europe) on February 24, 2014.

Track listing

References

2014 albums
Milagres (band) albums
Kill Rock Stars albums
Memphis Industries albums